Estrogen receptor alpha (ERα), also known as NR3A1 (nuclear receptor subfamily 3, group A, member 1), is one of two main types of estrogen receptor, a nuclear receptor (mainly found as a chromatin-binding protein) 
that is activated by the sex hormone estrogen.  In humans, ERα is encoded by the gene ESR1 (EStrogen Receptor 1).

Structure 
The estrogen receptor (ER) is a ligand-activated transcription factor composed of several domains important for hormone binding, DNA binding, and activation of transcription. Alternative splicing results in several ESR1 mRNA transcripts, which differ primarily in their 5-prime untranslated regions. The translated receptors show less variability.

Ligands

Agonists

Non-selective
 Endogenous estrogens (e.g., estradiol, estrone, estriol, estetrol)
 Natural estrogens (e.g., conjugated equine estrogens)
 Synthetic estrogens (e.g., ethinylestradiol, diethylstilbestrol)

Selective
Agonists of ERα selective over ERβ include:

 Propylpyrazoletriol (PPT)
 16α-LE2 (Cpd1471)
 16α-IE2
 ERA-63 (ORG-37663)
 SKF-82,958 – also a D1-like receptor full agonist
 (R,R)-Tetrahydrochrysene ((R,R)-THC) – actually not selective over ERβ, but rather an antagonist instead of an agonist of ERβ

Mixed
 Phytoestrogens (e.g., coumestrol, daidzein, genistein, miroestrol)
 Selective estrogen receptor modulators (e.g., tamoxifen, clomifene, raloxifene)

Antagonists

Non-selective
 Antiestrogens (e.g., fulvestrant, ICI-164384, ethamoxytriphetol)

Selective
Antagonists of ERα selective over ERβ include:

 Methylpiperidinopyrazole (MPP)

Affinities

Tissue distribution and function 
ERα plays a role in the physiological development and function of a variety of organ systems to varying degrees, including the reproductive, central nervous, skeletal, and cardiovascular systems. Accordingly, ERα is widely expressed throughout the body, including the uterus and ovary, male reproductive organs, mammary gland, bone, heart, hypothalamus, pituitary gland, liver, lung, kidney, spleen, and adipose tissue. The development and function of these tissues is disrupted in animal models lacking active ERα genes, such as the ERα knockout mouse (ERKO), providing a preliminary understanding of ERα function at specific target organs.

Uterus and ovary 
ERα is essential in the maturation of the female reproductive phenotype. In the absence of ERα, the ERKO mouse develops an adult uterus, indicating that ERα may not mediate the initial growth of the uterus. However, ERα plays a role in the completion of this development, and the subsequent function of the tissue. Activation of ERα is known to trigger cell proliferation in the uterus. The uterus of female ERKO mice is hypoplastic, suggesting that ERα mediates mitosis and differentiation in the uterus in response to estrogen stimulation.

Similarly, prepubertal female ERKO mice develop ovaries that are nearly indistinguishable from those of their wildtype counterparts. However, as the ERKO mice mature they progressively present an abnormal ovarian phenotype in both physiology and function. Specifically, female ERKO mice develop enlarged ovaries containing hemorrhagic follicular cysts, which also lack the corpus luteum, and therefore do not ovulate. This adult ovarian phenotype suggests that in the absence of ERα, estrogen is no longer able to perform negative feedback on the hypothalamus, resulting in chronically elevated LH levels and constant ovarian stimulation. These results identify a pivotal role for ERα in the hypothalamus, in addition to its role in the estrogen-driven maturation through theca and interstitial cells of the ovary.

Male reproductive organs 
ERα is similarly essential in the maturation and maintenance of the male reproductive phenotype, as male ERKO mice are infertile and present undersized testes. The integrity of testicular structures of ERKO mice, such as the seminiferous tubules of the testes and the seminiferous epithelium, declines over time. Furthermore, the reproductive performance of male ERKO mice is hindered by abnormalities in sexual physiology and behavior, such as impaired spermatogenesis and loss of intromission and ejaculatory responses.

Mammary gland 
Estrogen stimulation of ERα is known to stimulate cell proliferation in breast tissue. ERα is thought to be responsible for pubertal development of the adult phenotype, through mediation of mammary gland response to estrogens. This role is consistent with the abnormalities of female ERKO mice: the epithelial ducts of female ERKO mice fail to grow beyond their pre-pubertal length, and lactational structures do not develop. As a result, the functions of the mammary gland—including both lactation and release of prolactin—are greatly impaired in ERKO mice.

Bone 
Though its expression in bone is moderate, ERα is known to be responsible for maintenance of bone integrity. It is hypothesized that estrogen stimulation of ERα may trigger the release of growth factors, such as epidermal growth factor or insulin-like growth factor-1, which in turn regulate bone development and maintenance. Accordingly, male and female ERKO mice exhibit decreased bone length and size.

Brain 
Estrogen signaling through ERα appears to be responsible for various aspects of central nervous development, such as synaptogenesis and synaptic remodeling. In the brain, ERα is found in hypothalamus, and preoptic area, and arcuate nucleus, all three of which have been linked to reproductive behavior, and the masculinization of the mouse brain appears to take place through ERα function. Furthermore, studies in models of psychopathology and neurodegenerative disease states suggest that estrogen receptors mediate the neuroprotective role of estrogen in the brain. Finally, ERα appears to mediate positive feedback effects of estrogen on the brain's secretion of GnRH and LH, by way increasing expression of kisspeptin in neurons of the arcuate nucleus and anteroventral periventricular nucleus. Although classical studies have suggested that negative feedback effects of estrogen also operate through ERα, female mice lacking ERα in kisspeptin-expressing neurons continue to demonstrate a degree of negative feedback response.

Clinical significance
Estrogen insensitivity syndrome is a very rare condition characterized by a defective ERα that is insensitive to estrogens. The clinical presentation of a female was observed to include absence of breast development and other female secondary sexual characteristics at puberty, hypoplastic uterus, primary amenorrhea, enlarged multicystic ovaries and associated lower abdominal pain, mild hyperandrogenism (manifested as cystic acne), and delayed bone maturation as well as an increased rate of bone turnover. The clinical presentation in a male was reported to include lack of epiphyseal closure, tall stature, osteoporosis, and poor sperm viability. Both individuals were completely insensitive to exogenous estrogen treatment, even with high doses.

Genetic polymorphisms in the gene encoding the ERα have been associated with breast cancer in women, gynecomastia in men and dysmenorrhea.

Coactivators
Coactivators of ER-α include:
 SRC-1
 AIB1 – amplified in breast 1
 BCAS3 – Breast carcinoma amplified sequence 3
 PELP-1 – Proline-, glutamic acid-, leucine-rich protein 1

Interactions 

Estrogen receptor alpha has been shown to interact with:

 AKAP13
 AHR
 BRCA1
 CAV1
 CCNC
 CDC25B
 CEBPB
 COBRA1
 COUP-TFI
 CREBBP
 CRSP3
 Cyclin D1
 DDX17
 DDX5
 DNTTIP2
 EP300
 ESR2
 FOXO1
 GREB1
 GTF2H1
 HSPA1A
 HSPA8
 HSP90AA1
 ISL1
 JARID1A
 MVP
 MED1
 MED12
 MED14
 MED16
 MED24
 MED6
 MGMT
 MNAT1
 MTA1
 NCOA6
 NCOA1
 NCOA2
 NCOA3
 NRIP1
 PDLIM1
 POU4F1
 POU4F2
 PRDM2
 PRMT2
 RBM39
 RNF12
 SAFB
 SAFB2
 SHC1
 SHP
 SMARCA4
 SMARCE1
 SRA1
 Src
 TR2
 TR4
 TDG
 TRIM24 and
 XBP1.

References

Further reading

External links 
 
 

Intracellular receptors
Transcription factors